Robert John Rodriguez is an American film and television producer, executive, financier, banker and CEO of American United Entertainment.

Early life
Robert John Rodriguez was born in Los Angeles County, California. He is the son of Robert John Rodriguez, a professional football player for the Green Bay Packers, and his wife, Felicitas. He was raised in East Los Angeles and Hollywood. He spent most of his youth fighting in the ring as an amateur boxer and kickboxer. He also learned the classical music arts in orchestras and played with numerous bands on the Sunset strip. In Jr. High School, he enjoyed algebra and started programming software classes, which became his passion throughout high school as well.

Career
Rodriguez is the CEO, producer, and managing partner of American United Entertainment. Rodriguez recently collaborated with Han Capital Management on a $200 million fund for North American-based projects. Rodriguez was the former CIO of Aldamisa Entertainment(Sin City 2 "Dame for a Kill", "Chef", "Machete Kills","Jayne Mansfield's Car").

In 2011, Rodriguez created a film financing fund (Feature Film Partners VII) Yahoo Finance with former chairman and chief executive officer of Fox Filmed Entertainment, Bill Mechanic CEO of Pandemonium Films. In 2016, he is also heading Media Divisions for Silverbear Capital and SBC Financial Group, Global PE companies out of Hong Kong.

Filmography

Television

References

External links

Year of birth missing (living people)
American film producers
Living people
Film producers from California
People from Los Angeles County, California